Nandrolone cyclohexylpropionate (brand names Andol, Fherbolico, Megabolin, Megabolin Retar, Pluropon, Proteron-Depot, Sanabolicum), or nandrolone cyclohexanepropionate, also known as 19-nortestosterone 17β-(3-cyclohexyl)propionate (NTHCP), is a synthetic androgen and anabolic steroid and a nandrolone ester that is or has been marketed in Spain, Austria, and Israel.

See also
 List of androgen esters § Nandrolone esters

References

Androgens and anabolic steroids
Cyclohexyl compounds
Nandrolone esters
Progestogens
Carboxylate esters